Hugh Goldie (1919–2010) was an English theatre director.

Hugh Goldie may also refer to:
Hugh Goldie (footballer, born 1874), Scottish footballer active at the turn of the 20th century
Hugh Goldie (footballer, born 1923), Scottish footballer active in the 1950s